Lisa Francesca Nand (born 24 July 1974, in Bromborough, Wirral, Merseyside) is a journalist, travel writer and broadcaster (also known as Chessy) who started off on BBC Radio before becoming a co-presenter on the Ian Collins show on the UK radio station TalkSPORT. When she was appointed in 2006 she was the first female presenter on TalkSPORT. In 2006 she was voted third favourite female national radio presenter by readers of Merry Media News. She has been published widely online (for several years she had a bi-monthly travel vlog and blog for Sky.com and was also the UK correspondent for US company STR/Hotel News Now) and in the UK press (Telegraph, Independent, The Times, Daily Mail, National Geography Traveller) and is a regular expert guest on national radio and television (a regular travel expert on LBC Radio, BBC1's Rip Off Britain, BBC2 Radio2, 5Live and local BBC stations) as well as being known for creating and presenting online travel videos.

In 2015 she directed the authored documentary, First Heartbeat, about her experiences with miscarriage, broadcast on TLC UK and Discovery International around the world. 

She is a patron of the charity Thyroid UK.

References

External links
 The Lisa Francesca Nand Q&A Interview at talkSport
 Lisa Francesca Nand's journey with underactive Thyroid at Web of Stories

1974 births
Living people
People from Bromborough
English people of Indo-Fijian descent
English journalists
People educated at Varndean College